Mỹ Luông is a township (thị trấn Mỹ Luông) and town of the Chợ Mới District of An Giang Province, Vietnam.

Communes of An Giang province
Populated places in An Giang province
Townships in Vietnam